Mohamed-Mzali Sports Hall (in French: Salle omnisports Mohamed-Mzali), or simply Salle Mzali, is an indoor sports arena in Monastir, Tunisia. The arena is owned by the municipality of Monastir and is the home arena of basketball club US Monastir and is also occasionally used for volleyball matches.

The arena has a capacity of hosting 5,000 people. The arena was opened on 6 April 2006.

References

Indoor arenas in Tunisia
Sports venues completed in 2006
Basketball venues in Tunisia